Juan Tanca Marengo (1895–1965) was an Ecuadorian physician.

He graduated as a doctor in 1920 and specialized in gastroenterology in Paris (1933). In 1940 Colonel Julian founded the clinic. In 1945 he chaired the National Patriotic Council and was received as a member of the brand new House of Ecuadorian Culture . He was a member of the Board of Charities of Guayas (1947) and founder of the Society Against Cancer (SOLCA), also organized the Guayas Transit Commission.

References
This article was initially translated from the Spanish Wikipedia.

Ecuadorian gastroenterologists
1895 births
1965 deaths